"Wow" is a song by Australian singer Kylie Minogue from her tenth studio album, X (2007). It was written by Minogue, Greg Kurstin and Karen Poole, while production was handled by Kurstin. The song was released as the third single from X on 17 February 2008 by Parlophone.

"Wow" features instrumentation from guitars, electronic synthesizers, keyboards and drum machines, along with pianos through some verses. The song is set in a disco-oriented beat with many other electronic elements. Upon the song's release, it received positive reviews from contemporary music critics, who praised the production and release as a single. The song peaked inside the top 20 on the US Hot Dance Airplay chart, as well as charting inside the top twenty in countries including her native Australia, United Kingdom, Ireland, France, New Zealand and Hungary.

The song has been performed on all of Minogue's concert tours since it was released (with the exception of the Anti Tour), with it most recently performed at her 2018 Golden Tour. Along with the promotion on her tours, the song has been featured in many media productions. It has been used as background music in Desperate Housewives, performed at her TV special The Kylie Show and was included on the soundtrack of the film Beverly Hills Chihuahua.

Background and recording
"Wow" was composed and written by Greg Kurstin, Minogue and Karen Ann Poole. Minogue requested setting up a studio in Ibiza with previous writing partner Karen Poole and newcomer to the fold Greg Kurstin, an American multi-instrumentalist musician and producer, during the mid-2007. Originally, it was said that they wanted "Wow" or "Like a Drug" as the first single, but ultimately "2 Hearts" was released as the lead. Minogue intended the track to be the US lead single from the album, but it was withdrawn and "All I See" was released instead in an attempt to appeal to a more urban market. "All I See" ultimately failed to enter mainstream charts in the US. Following this, "Wow" was released as Minogue's first club single in North America. In Australia, "Wow" was officially sent to radio on 14 January 2008. Three new additional tracks were featured on the CD single, these being "Cherry Bomb", "Do It Again" and "Carried Away", which were recorded during the album sessions.

The song is written the key of D Major. Minogue's vocal range spans from the key note of F#3 to the key note of E5. Additionally, the song is set in common time and has a tempo of 124 beats per minute. Lyrically, the song talks about someone who stands out, with the title referring them as "Wow".

Music video
Two versions of the music video was released. The music video for "Wow" was directed by Melina Matsoukas and filmed in Los Angeles, California along with the video for "In My Arms" in early January 2008. The video features Minogue in dancing in a futuristic nightclub surrounded by dancers in alien outfits. The video begins with Minogue's silhouette dancing against a lighted background. She is then shown in a white tracksuit surrounded by a group of dancers. Scenes of Minogue and her dancers dancing in front of a lighted background are intercut throughout the video.

PerezHilton.com hosted the world premiere the music video on 29 January 2008. It was scheduled to premiere on Channel 4 in the United Kingdom on 30 January 2008, but was postponed. Media regulator Ofcom removed the video after they found it did not follow viewer guidelines due to the use of strobe lighting. The video was re-edited and broadcast in the United Kingdom the following week.

Reception

Critical response

"Wow" received mainly positive reviews from contemporary music critics. The Boston Globe had compared "Wow" with American singer Madonna's 1983 single "Holiday", but added "Wow" is "Holiday" on studio steroids". Kelefa Sanneh from The New York Times had said that "Wow"; "updates 80s-era Madonna". Evan Sawdey MusicOMH gave it a very positive review, as he compared the songs to Minogue's previous songs "Shocked", "Too Far", "Come into My World" and "The Loco-Motion", saying in his extended review; "it’s jam-packed with peppy melody, built around a simple, addictive piano melody that is soon shot into the pop stratosphere." He also said that the song is a "great track". Dave Hughes from Slant Magazine gave it a positive review, saying ""Wow" is a pretty great summation of the commercially successful aspects of Minogue's career to date—a hyperactive juvenile disco track full of fun, big-budget whooshes and drops, something utterly disposable that she sells without shame." They also highlighted the song as an album standout.

However, Alex Fletcher of Digital Spy wrote that "Wow" "doesn't have the 'oomph' factor to make us fall for her like we have in the past", but the song's "disco swirls and whooshing synths are great fun". In a review for The Guardian, Alexis Petridis called the song "fantastic" and compared it to Minogue's songs with Stock, Aitken and Waterman. Pitchfork Media reviewer Tom Ewing wrote that the song's "excitement is infectious" even though its "funked-up electro sexiness may feel contrived".

Chart performance
"Wow" debuted on the UK Singles Chart at number thirty-two on 24 December 2007, based solely on digital download sales. Ten weeks later, the song reached number five. In February 2008, the song topped the UK Upfront Club Chart. This eventually became Minogue's best selling single in the UK since 2002's "Love at First Sight". As of 2022, “Wow” has accrued 268,132 sales in the UK, according to the Official Charts Company. The song was also very successful in France, where the song debuted at number fifteen, then descended to ninety-eighth. The song then re-entered to peak at number eighty-eight, but stayed in the French Singles Chart for twenty-two weeks in total. The song had also European chart peaks, where it peaked at number thirty-three on the Austrian Singles Chart and number fifty-one on the Swiss Singles Chart,

In Minogue's native Australia, The song debuted at number eleven where it peaked, and remained on the singles chart for eight weeks. It debuted at number thirty-four on the Swedish Singles Chart, until rising to number thirty-two, where it peaked, and stayed in the charts for five weeks. In the Romanian Singles Chart, the song debuted at number 63 in February, finally peaking at number 42 in June, becoming her first song ever to miss the top 20. In New Zealand, the song debuted at number seventeen on 24 February 2008. Following radio airplay, it later rose to number sixteen on 9 March 2008.

In North America, the song was released to American dance radio-stations and became a moderate success when it debuted within the Top 40 of the Billboard Hot Dance Airplay chart, eventually peaking at number nineteen. The song also peaked at number sixteen and seventeen on the Euro Digital Tracks and Euro Digital Songs charts, respectively.

Live performances
The song was also performed on:
 The Kylie Show
 2008 BRIT Awards
 The X Factor season 4
 BBC Proms in the Park 2012 (orchestral version of the song)

Formats and track listings

UK CD single
 "Wow" - 3:10
 "Cherry Bomb" - 4:16

UK CD maxi single / Australia CD maxi single
 "Wow" — 3:13
 "Do It Again" — 3:21
 "Carried Away" — 3:14
 "Wow" (Death Metal Disco Scene Mix) — 6:27

UK 12" picture disc
 "Wow" — 3:13
 "Wow" (CSS Mix) — 3:14
 "Wow" (F*** Me I'm Famous Remix by David Guetta & Joachim Garraud) - 6:22
 "Wow" (MSTRKRFT Remix) - 4:45

EU CD maxi single
 "Wow" — 3:16
 "Wow" (Death Metal Disco Scene Mix) — 6:27
 "Wow" (CSS Mix) — 3:14
 "Wow" (Video)

EU CD single
 "Wow" — 3:16
 "Can't Get You Out of My Head (Greg Kurstin Remix)" — 4:05

Digital download 1
 "Wow" — 3:13
 "2 Hearts" (Mark Brown's Pacha Ibiza Upper Terrace Mix) - 7:02

Digital download 2
 "Wow" — 3:13
 "Do It Again" — 3:21
 "Carried Away" — 3:14
 "Cherry Bomb" - 4:16

Digital download 3
 "Wow" — 3:16
 "Wow" (CSS Mix) — 3:14
 "Wow" (MSTRKRFT Remix) - 4:45
 "Wow" (F*** Me I'm Famous Remix by David Guetta & Joachim Garraud) - 6:22
 "Wow" (Death Metal Disco Scene Mix) — 6:27

Personnel
The following people contributed to "Wow":
 Kylie Minogue – lead vocals
 Greg Kurstin - production, all instruments, mixing
 Karen Poole — backing vocals, vocal production
 Eddie Miller - additional engineering
 Geoff Pesche - mastering
 Recorded at Magnetic Studios in Ibiza and Echo Studios in Los Angeles

Charts

Weekly charts

Year-end charts

Certifications

Release history

References

External links
Kylie – Official website

2007 songs
2008 singles
Kylie Minogue songs
Music videos directed by Melina Matsoukas
Song recordings produced by Greg Kurstin
Songs written by Greg Kurstin
Songs written by Karen Poole
Songs written by Kylie Minogue
Articles containing video clips
disco songs
dance-pop songs
bubblegum pop songs